The Cheque and Credit Clearing Company Limited (C&CCC) is a UK membership-based industry body whose 11 members are the UK clearing banks. The company has managed the cheque clearing system in England and Wales since 1985, in all of Great Britain since 1996 when it took over responsibility for managing the Scottish cheque clearing as well, and in the whole of the United Kingdom since the introduction of the Image Clearing System in 2019.

As well as clearing cheques, the system processes the following forms of payment: banker's drafts, building society cheques, postal orders, warrants, government payable orders and traveller's cheques.  The company also manages the systems for the clearing of paper bank giro credits (the credit clearing).

The clearing system in Northern Ireland was formerly operated by the Belfast Bankers' Clearing Company for the four clearing banks there.

History
In 2009 3.5 million cheques and 360,000 paper credits passed through the British interbank clearing system each working day. Cheque volumes reached a peak in 1990 when 4 billion cheques were written, but usage has fallen since then. This is mainly due to alternative methods of payment such as direct debits, BACS payments and more recently, the Faster Payments Service, being used more widely by individuals and businesses. The annual rate of decline of the volume of cheques being used is now in double figures.

Members
Members of the Cheque and Credit Clearing Company are individually responsible for processing cheques drawn by, or credited to, the accounts of their customers. In addition, several hundred other institutions provide cheque facilities for their customers and obtain indirect access to the cheque clearing mechanisms by means of commercially negotiated agency arrangements with one of the full members.

Members of the Image Clearing System, as of 2019, are:

 Access Bank
 Allied Irish Bank
 Bank of Ireland
 Barclays Bank
 Clydesdale Bank
 The Co-operative Bank
 Habib Bank Zurich
 HSBC UK
 Lloyds Bank
 Nationwide Building Society  
 National Westminster Bank
 Northern Bank (trading as Danske Bank)	
 The Royal Bank of Scotland
 Santander UK
 TSB Bank
 Turkish Bank
 Virgin Money

The members of the paper clearing, shut down in August 2019, were:

 Bank of England
 Bank of Scotland
 Barclays
 Clear Bank
 Clydesdale Bank
 The Co-operative Bank
 HSBC Bank
 Lloyds Bank
 National Westminster Bank
 Nationwide Building Society
 The Royal Bank of Scotland
 Santander UK

2-4-6 changes to cheque clearing
From the end of November 2007, changes known as 2-4-6 came into force. These have increased clarity and certainty when paying in cheques to a bank or building society account.

The 2-4-6 changes set a maximum time limit of two, four and six working days for each of the stages after paying in a cheque to a current or basic bank account. The timescales cover cheques, bankers' drafts, bankers' cheques and building society cheques paid into sterling current and basic bank accounts. For deposit or savings accounts the maximum time limit for withdrawal is longer (6 days, rather than 4).

For the first time, after depositing a cheque, customers can be sure that at the end of six working days, the money is theirs. They are protected from any loss if the cheque subsequently bounces, unless they are a knowing party to a fraud. The timescales also set maximum times when customers start earning interest on money paid in (2 days) and when it will be available for withdrawal.

Merged into NPSO

Cheque and Credit Clearing Company Limited announced that on 1 July 2018 it had become a wholly owned subsidiary of NPSO Limited, the New Payments Systems Operator (Pay.UK), and that the C&CCC board had handed management over to the board of NPSO.

See also
Clearing house (finance)
UK Payments Administration
Clearing House Automated Payment System (CHAPS)
Bankers Automated Clearing Services (BACS)
Payments Council
Faster Payments Service

References

External links
Cheque and Credit Clearing Company
British Bankers' Association Understanding the cheque clearing cycle
Association for Payment Clearing Services The Cheque and Credit Clearing Company

Financial services companies of the United Kingdom
1985 establishments in the United Kingdom
Banking in the United Kingdom
Financial services companies established in 1985
British companies established in 1985
Payment clearing systems